Race 07 is a racing simulator computer game from SimBin Studios (later Sector3 Studios). The game is the sequel to the 2006 title Race – The Official WTCC Game. Like the original Race, the title is officially licensed by the World Touring Car Championship (WTCC).

Race 07 features more than 300 cars in nine different racing classes. Race 07 includes the full 2006 and 2007 seasons of the FIA World Touring Car Championships (FIA WTCC) as well as 8 more classes on 14 tracks from all over the world.

Multiplayer is only available with installation of the Steam client and registration for an account with Steam.

Reception

The game was moderately-well received by critics. IGN stated that the game was "not as likely to win over a casual racer, because little was done to cultivate new hardcore sim racing fans here". PC Format, Eurogamer, Boomtown and PTGamers all agreed that "visuals aren’t the main attraction of the game", while PC Zone criticised the AI and crash damage. 
GameShark and AceGamez praised the game's longevity.

Content

Cars

Tracks

Expansion packs

It has since spawned nine expansion packs: GTR Evolution, STCC – The Game, Race On, Formula Raceroom (free of charge), STCC – The Game 2, GT Power, WTCC 2010, RETRO and the final expansion to the series, Race Injection.

Formula Raceroom is a free add-on pack to RACE 07 developed by SimBin and adds a Formula One style car and Hockenheimring circuit to the original game. It was released on March 18, 2011.

STCC – The Game is an expansion pack that features the 2008 Swedish Touring Car Championship season and its support series, the Camaro Cup.

Race On

Race On is an expansion pack to RACE 07 developed by SimBin Studios (later Sector3 Studios) and adds the 2008 World Touring Car Championship season, the International Formula Master series and some American Muscle Cars in both road and race-tuned versions to RACE 07. It was released internationally on October 16, 2009. It is available as a stand-alone game including Race 07 as well as its previous expansion pack STCC - The Game (which was only released as a boxed copy in Scandinavia) and as an add-on pack to those who already have Race 07 and/or STCC - The Game.

Tracks
Two brand new American tracks (Laguna Seca and Road America) are included in the game, as well as a considerably higher number of races from America itself. To accompany the 2008 WTCC cars, updated versions of the 2006 & 2007 tracks featured in RACE 07 are included, plus the new circuit for that season, Okayama.

Cars
Race On includes all cars from Race 07, plus five new ones. Those are four US Muscle cars in race and street version plus the European International Formula Master.

 Cadillac CTS-V
 Chevrolet Camaro
 Dodge Challenger SRT8
 Dodge Charger SRT8
 International Formula Master (Tatuus-Honda)

Series/Championships
 World Touring Car Championship (2008)
 US Muscle Car Series
 International Formula Master series

Reception
Race On received mixed reviews, scoring a Metacritic average of 73%.

IT Reviews commented that "Race On is a good value for money package, with a colossal number of cars and tracks on offer if you've not got the original game". However, it added that for those who already own Race 07, all you get is "new muscle cars to play around with, and the Swedish championship", which makes it a "slightly less compelling purchase for them".

PC Gamer magazine in the UK agreed broadly with this: "It's not bad value if you're new to Race 07, but is perhaps a raw deal for those who own the base game".

References

External links

Race 07 at MobyGames
Race 07 On Steam (service)

2007 video games
Auto GP
Racing simulators
SimBin Studios games
Video games developed in Sweden
Video games set in Sweden
Video games with expansion packs
Windows games
Windows-only games
World Touring Car Championship
Multiplayer and single-player video games